Hanger Mill, also known as Huff Mill, is a historic grist mill located at Churchville, Augusta County, Virginia. It was built about 1860, and is a 2 1/2-story, limestone and heavy mortise-and-tenon frame building with a metal gable roof and weatherboard siding.  It has an attached one-story office structure.  The mill operated until 1940, and retains most of its milling machinery.

It was listed on the National Register of Historic Places in 1991.

References

Grinding mills on the National Register of Historic Places in Virginia
Industrial buildings completed in 1860
Buildings and structures in Augusta County, Virginia
National Register of Historic Places in Augusta County, Virginia
Grinding mills in Virginia